Monty Python: The Meaning of Live is a 2014 British documentary telefilm, directed by Roger Graef and James Rogan, about a 10-day series of live performances at London's O arena. The film features interviews with Monty Python members John Cleese, Terry Gilliam, Eric Idle, Terry Jones and Michael Palin as they perform on stage together for the first time in 34 years. Also appearing are Carol Cleveland, Prof. Brian Cox, Stephen Hawking and Mike Myers. The documentary is dedicated to Graham Chapman.

As well as covering the reunion shows, the documentary recaps the Pythons' live history; from their first stage performance in 1971, to tours of the UK and Canada in 1973, the 1974 Drury Lane shows in London, the 1976 City Center shows in New York and, finally, their 1980 performances at the Hollywood Bowl.

The film features behind-the-scenes footage of the reunion, ranging from the first script reading to dress rehearsals plagued by technical difficulties. Much backstage footage from across the ten nights is shown, as well as film of one of the after-show Q&As. Michael Palin is seen filming a sketch for inclusion in the heavily censored pre-watershed first half of UKTV Gold's live screening of the tenth and final show. The channel aired the documentary on 13 November 2014.

Cast
 John Cleese
 Terry Gilliam
 Eric Idle
 Terry Jones
 Michael Palin
 Carol Cleveland
 Jim Beach
 Brian Cox
 Stephen Hawking
 Holly Gilliam
 Mike Myers

References

External links
 

2014 documentary films
2014 television films
2014 films
British documentary films
Documentary films about comedy and comedians
Monty Python films
2010s English-language films
2010s British films